Forest Lawn is a neighbourhood and former town in the southeast quadrant of the city of Calgary, Alberta, Canada. The neighbourhood is bound by 26 Avenue SE to the south, 36 Street SE to the west, 8 Avenue SE to the north and portions of 52 Street SE and 48 Street SE to the east. The former town comprises the entire current Forest Lawn neighbourhood as well as portions of Southview and Albert Park/Radisson Heights to the west, and portions of Penbrooke Meadows and Forest Lawn Industrial to the east. Both the neighbourhood and the former town are bisected by the multicultural 17 Avenue SE. Forest Lawn has an area redevelopment plan in place and is part of the International Avenue Business Revitalization Zone.

The community is represented in the Calgary City Council by the Ward 9 councillor. On a federal level, Forest Lawn falls in the electoral district of Calgary Forest Lawn and is currently represented in the House of Commons by MP Jasraj Hallan.

History 
The area was first settled in the early 1900s. Originally part of the Municipal District of Shepard No. 220, Forest Lawn and nearby Albert Park incorporated as villages on July 4, 1934. Forest Lawn and Albert Park amalgamated just over a year later on August 1, 1935 under the name of the Village of Forest Lawn. In 1952, Forest Lawn was incorporated as the Town of Forest Lawn and pursued city status in 1958 although the application was never carried through. The town was subsequently annexed by the City of Calgary on December 30, 1961, along with parts of the municipal districts of Rocky View No. 44 and Foothills No. 31.

Demographics 

Residents in this community had a median household income of $40,396 in 2000, and there were 27.5% low income residents living in the neighbourhood. As of 2000, 18.6% of the residents were immigrants. A proportion of 29.4% of the buildings were condominiums or apartments, and 57.7% of the housing was used for renting.

Education 
The community is served by Forest Lawn Senior High, Jack James Senior High, Ian Bazalgette Junior High, Ernest Morrow Junior High, Patrick Airlie Elementary, and Valley View Elementary public schools, as well as Holy Trinity Elementary, Father Lacombe Senior High, and Holy Cross Elementary/Junior High (Catholic).

Forest Lawn Industrial 
The neighbourhood of Forest Lawn Industrial is established south of International Avenue, and east of 48 St SE, between Elliston Park and 48 St SE.

In 2006 it had a median household income of $27,945 in 2000.

Recreational 
This area is served by two recreational pools. The Bob Bahan Aquatic and Fitness Centre, opened October 1974 and named after a community member of outstanding record, offers a number of registered and drop-in fitness classes, programs and lessons, both in the pool and on dry land. The Forest Lawn Outdoor Pool is operated by the community association.

See also 
List of former urban municipalities in Alberta
List of neighbourhoods in Calgary

References

External links 
Forest Lawn Community Association
International Avenue BRZ
 Bob Bahan Aquatic & Fitness Centre

Neighbourhoods in Calgary